In enzymology, an alkenylglycerophosphocholine hydrolase is an enzyme that catalyzes the chemical reaction

1-(1-alkenyl)-sn-glycero-3-phosphocholine + H2O  an aldehyde + sn-glycero-3-phosphocholine

Thus, the two substrates of this enzyme are 1-(1-alkenyl)-sn-glycero-3-phosphocholine and H2O, whereas its two products are aldehyde and sn-glycero-3-phosphocholine.

This enzyme belongs to the family of hydrolases, specifically those acting on ether bonds (ether hydrolases).  The systematic name of this enzyme class is 1-(1-alkenyl)-sn-glycero-3-phosphocholine aldehydohydrolase. This enzyme is also called lysoplasmalogenase.  This enzyme participates in ether lipid metabolism.

References

 
 
 

EC 3.3.2
Enzymes of unknown structure